The Tour of Qatar was an annual professional cycling stage race held in Qatar. First organized in 2002, the event was part of the UCI Asia Tour until 2016. The 2017 edition was to have seen the event upgraded to the UCI World Tour for the first time, but it was cancelled due to lack of sponsorship support.

The event consisted of a men's competition over five stages, and, since 2009, a women's competition over four stages – held a week before the men's race. Because Qatar is entirely flat, the tour was almost always won by a sprinter or classics specialist. Belgian Tom Boonen  and Dutchwoman Kirsten Wild hold the record with four overall wins, in the men's and ladies' competition respectively.

Men's past winners

General classification

Points classification

Stage wins

Ladies' past winners

General classification

Points classification

2017 Cancellation 
The 2017 Tour of Qatar was scheduled to take place between 6 and 10 February 2017. However, in December 2016, the event was cancelled due to lack of sponsorship support. It would have been the 16th edition of the race and third event of the 2017 UCI World Tour. It was included in the UCI World Tour calendar for the first time.

Notes

References

External links

 
 Statistics at the-sports.org
 Tour of Qatar at cqranking.com

 
Cycle races in Qatar
UCI World Tour races
UCI Asia Tour races
Recurring sporting events established in 2002
2002 establishments in Qatar
 
Women's road bicycle races